"Either Way" is a song by British electronic music duo Snakehips and English singer Anne-Marie, featuring American rapper Joey Badass. It was written by James David, Julia Michaels, Warren "Oak" Felder, Oliver Dickinson and Joey Badass, with production handled by Snakehips, Oak and Cass Lowe. The song was released on 28 July 2017, via Sony Music.

Critical reception
Kat Bein of Billboard felt that the song has a "cool R&B sound". He continued: "Some low-key tropical touches add to the lazy summer haze. It also doubles as dope makeup inspo." Marcus of EDM Sauce opined that the song is "elegantly crafted and natural", has "an R&B feel" and "some killer melody". Matt F of HotNewHipHop thinks that Snakehips brought "their brand of catchy pop flavor" to the song and Anne-Marie's "soft, melodic tones are contrasted nicely" with Joey Badass' "gruffer, deeper delivery". He regarded the song as "another solid entry into the current musical zeitgeist for Snakehips". Steph Evans of Earmilk described the collaboration as "a summertime pop jam that we'll remember". Jordan Farley of Run The Trap wrote: "The sultry single bounces catchy vocals between Anne-Marie and Joey Badass over a silky future pop beat and is instantly captivating in its elegant beauty." Kevin Apaza of Direct Lyrics wrote that the song is "so good" and "so catchy".

Credits and personnel
Credits adapted from Tidal.

 Snakehips – producing, engineering
 Joey Badass – writing
 James David – composing, programming
 Julia Michaels – writing
 Warren "Oak" Felder – writing, co-producing, programming
 Oliver Dickinson – writing, programming, recording engineering
 Chris Galland – mixing engineering
 Robin Florent – mixing engineering
 Scott Desmarais – mixing engineering
 Dave Kutch – mastering engineering
 Manny Marroquin – engineering
 Cass Lowe – co-producing, programming
 Graeme Baldwin – recording engineering
 Cameron Poole – recording engineering

Charts

Certifications

References

2017 singles
2017 songs
Snakehips (duo) songs
Anne-Marie (singer) songs
Songs written by Julia Michaels
Songs written by Oak Felder
Songs written by Joey Badass
Song recordings produced by Oak Felder
Sony Music UK singles
Futurepop songs